Thomas Coplestone (1688–1748) of Bowden, Yealmpton, Devon, was a British landowner and Whig politician who sat in the House of Commons for 29 years from 1719 to 1748.

Origins
Coplestone was baptized on 25 May 1688 the eldest son of John Copleston of Bowden and his wife Mary Reynell of West Ogwell, Devon.

From the 15th century until 1748 Bowden was for 8 generations the seat of a junior branch of the prominent and ancient Copleston family of Copplestone in the parish of  Colebrooke, Devon. It was first the seat of Walter Copleston, the 3rd son of John Copleston (d.1458) of Copleston. John Copleston served three times as a Member of Parliament for Devon, and married Elizabeth Hawley (d.1457), daughter and eventual heiress of John Hawley (died 1436) "the Younger", of Dartmouth in Devon, 12 times a Member of Parliament for Dartmouth, and son of John Hawley (d.1408) ("the Elder") of Dartmouth, a wealthy ship owner who served fourteen times as Mayor of Dartmouth and was elected four times as a Member of Parliament for Dartmouth, whose magnificent monumental brass survives in St Saviour's Church, Dartmouth.

Career
He was admitted at the Middle Temple in 1704 for training as a lawyer. He was elected a Member of Parliament for Callington in Cornwall, a pocket borough owned by the Rolle family of Heanton Satchville, Petrockstowe, Devon, at a by-election on 4 December 1719 in succession to Samuel Rolle (1646–1719) of whose estates he was a trustee. He was a Whig and voted with the Administration in every recorded division, except when he was absent. He was elected again in  1722 , but was returned unopposed in 1727. In 1730, he was appointed Clerk of quit-rents and forfeitures in Ireland and held the post for the rest of his life. He was returned unopposed as MP for Callington in 1734 but he faced contests which he won in 1741 and 1747.

Death and succession
He died unmarried on 19 February 1748. After his death his executors sold Bowden to William Pollexfen Bastard (1727–1782) of nearby Kitley in the parish of Yealmpton, who was gazetted as a baronet in 1779 but as he took no steps towards passing the patent the title was not used by him or his descendants.

References

1688 births
1748 deaths
Members of the Parliament of Great Britain for Callington
British MPs 1715–1722
British MPs 1722–1727
British MPs 1727–1734
British MPs 1734–1741
British MPs 1741–1747
British MPs 1747–1754